The Metropolitan Transit Authority of Black Hawk County, marketed as MET Transit, is the primary provider of mass transportation in the cities of Waterloo and Cedar Falls, Iowa. The agency was founded in 1972, after the private National City Lines, which had operated public transit under contract from the city, pulled out of providing fixed routes, which led to the city directly taking over this service.

MET Transit is a flag down system, which means there are no dedicated bus stops, and a bus may be flagged down at any near side intersection along a route.

Routes
1 Westside-Ansborough Ave
2 Westside-Baltimore St
3 Eastside-Donald St
4 Eastside-Lafayette St
5 Crossroads-West 11th St
5L Crossroads-Laporte Rd
6 Cedar Falls-University
7 Cedar Falls-Rainbow
8 West Loop
9 Cedar Falls Loop
10 Hawkeye Community College-UNI
11 UNI Panther Shuttle

Facilities
Central Transfer - This facility is located at 416 Sycamore Street in downtown Waterloo and constructed prior to 1995. The facility serves as the primary transfer hub of MET Transit and also provides connections to intercity bus services operated by Burlington Trailways.
UNI Multimodal Transportation Center - This facility, located at 1215 West 23rd St, on the UNI Campus in Cedar Falls, was constructed in 2010. The facility provides an indoor waiting area with restrooms and information. Bike lockers and over 490 vehicle parking spaces are also available. A solar array on the roof provides all the electricity needs of the $9.7 million building.

Fixed Route Ridership

The ridership and service statistics shown here are of fixed route services only and do not include demand response. Per capita statistics are based on the Waterloo urbanized area as reported in NTD data. Starting in 2011, 2010 census numbers replace the 2000 census numbers to calculate per capita statistics.

See also
 List of bus transit systems in the United States
 List of intercity bus stops in Iowa

References

External links
 MET Transit

Bus transportation in Iowa
Cedar Falls, Iowa
Transportation in Black Hawk County, Iowa
Transit agencies in Iowa